Proraster is a genus of echinoderms belonging to the family Hemiasteridae.

The species of this genus are found in Europe, Northern America and Australia.

Species:

Proraster atavus 
Proraster geayi 
Proraster granti 
Proraster jukesii 
Proraster magnus 
Proraster oedumi

References

Spatangoida
Echinoidea genera